Christy Ren (born August 5, 1983) is a former short track speed skater Olympian representing Hong Kong at the 2002 Olympics. Ren is an investment banker with HSBC.

Early life
On 05 Aug 1983, Ren was born in Hong Kong. At age 8, Ren started figure skating.

Education
In 2002, as a freshman at Tufts University in Medford, Massachusetts, Ren competed in the 2002 Olympics. In 2005, Ren graduated from Tufts University.

Career (Sport)
She competed at the 2002 Winter Olympics for Hong Kong. Along with teammate Cordia Tsoi Pop-Yee, they became the first athletes to represent Hong Kong at the Winter Olympics.

She was a member of the Hong Kong Speedskating Union.

After the 2002 Games, Ren has since left the sporting world and completed her studies at Tufts. Ren is working in investment banking with HSBC.

Ren is fluent in English, Cantonese and Mandarin.

References

External links
 

1983 births
Living people
Hong Kong female short track speed skaters
Olympic short track speed skaters of Hong Kong
Short track speed skaters at the 2002 Winter Olympics
Short track speed skaters at the 1999 Asian Winter Games
Tufts University alumni
HSBC people